Leandrinho may also refer to:

Leandro Barbosa (born 1982), Brazilian professional basketball player
Leandrinho (footballer, born 1986), Leandro Barrios Rita dos Martires, Brazilian football striker
Leandrinho (footballer, born 1993), Leandro Cordeiro de Lima Silva, Brazilian football midfielder
Leandrinho (footballer, born 1996), Leandro Alves de Carvalho, Brazilian football midfielder
Leandrinho (footballer, born 1998), Leandro Henrique do Nascimento, Brazilian football striker